JTV (Jawa Timur Televisi) is a private television station in Surabaya, East Java serving the whole province of East Java. JTV is the first regional private television in Indonesia, as well as one of the early television stations which broadcast several programs in the Javanese language. JTV transmission can be caught in East Java and some area of Central Java using aerial or by satellite Telkom-4 4080/H/32677, Pay TV (First Media, IndiHome, MNC Play, Transvision), Streaming (www.jtv.co.id), Apps (Vidio, Maxstream, JPM Stream).

This private TV station is owned by Jawa Pos Group, that also has some affiliation with some TV stations and newspapers.

Transmitters

Programs 

 Jatim Awan
 Dialog Khusus
 Pojok 7
 Pojok Kampung
 Nusantara Kini
 Pojok Pagi
 Pojok Siang
 Pojok Sore
 Pojok Malam
 Pojok News Update 
 Breaking News
 Kabar Apik
 Warung VOA (from VOA)
 Bincang Sore
 Solusi Bisnis
 Blakra'an
 Ndoro Bei
 Stasiun Dangdut
 Solusi Bisnis
 Mangan Weeenak
 Solusi Sehat
 Gak Cuma Cangkru'an
 Lejel Home Shopping
 Gogomall Home Shopping
 O Shop (from O Channel)
 Voice of Soman

See also 
 List of television stations in Indonesia

References

External links 
 Official Site

Mass media in Surabaya
Television stations in Indonesia
Television channels and stations established in 2001